Phaon is a boatman from Greek mythology, lover of Sappho.

Phaon may also refer to:
 Phaon (freedman), a confidant of Roman emperor Nero
 Phaon (fiction), a character in The Faerie Queene
 Phaon (damselfly), a genus of damselfly
 Phyciodes phaon, or phaon crescent, a species of butterfly
 
Phaon, a play by the 4th–5th century poet Plato that survives in fragments

See also
 Phaonia, very large genus from the fly family Muscidae